The Exposition Cotton Mills were cotton mills located in what is now the West Midtown area of Atlanta at the upper end of the Marietta Street Artery, an area rich with industrial heritage architecture. They were built on what had been Oglethorpe Park for the International Cotton Exposition of 1881 and were demolished in 1952. A warehouse and distribution center now occupy the site.

The original address was 794 West Marietta Street, but has since changed to 841 Joseph E. Lowery Blvd. (formerly Ashby Street) NW.

See also
Evan Howell, one of the founders
Fiddlin' John Carson, one-time worker at Exposition Cotton Mills who became a well-known musician later

References

External links
 Photos of Exposition Cotton Mills at Atlanta History Center site
Exposition Cotton Mills, Marietta Street Artery

Demolished buildings and structures in Atlanta
Industrial landmarks in Atlanta
Industrial buildings completed in 1881
Buildings and structures demolished in 1952
World's fair architecture in the United States
1881 establishments in Georgia (U.S. state)